William Reichenstein Uttal (March 24, 1931 – February 5, 2017) was an American psychologist and engineer known for his criticism of cognitive neuroscience, and for his advocacy for distributed neural processing. In Uttal's obituary in the American Journal of Psychology, Stanley Coren wrote that "His distinguished academic career is difficult to classify, but his specialty probably should be put under the heading "cognitive science"."

He was married for 64 years to Michiye May Nishimura Uttal. He has three daughters: Lynet Uttal, Taneil Uttal, and Lisa Meek Uttal.

References

20th-century American psychologists
American cognitive scientists
1931 births
2017 deaths
20th-century American engineers
Ohio State University alumni
University of Michigan faculty
Arizona State University faculty
People from Mineola, New York